The 2006 Guelph municipal election was held on November 13, 2006, in Guelph, Ontario, Canada, to elect the Mayor of Guelph, Guelph City Council and the Guelph members of the Upper Grand District School Board (Public) and Wellington Catholic District School Board. The election was one of many races across the province of Ontario.

Election results
Names in bold denotes elected candidates. 
(X) denotes incumbent.

Mayor
One candidate to be elected.

Councillors
Two candidates per ward to be elected.

Ward 1

 The Ward 1 tie between Laura Baily and Kathleen Farrelly was broken under the Municipal Elections Act with the City Clerk drawing Baily's name randomly by lot.

Ward 2

Ward 3

Ward 4

Ward 5

Ward 6

Upper Grand District School Board

Wards 1, 5 and 6
Two candidates to be elected.

Wards 2, 3 and 4
Two candidates to be elected.

Wellington Catholic District School Board
Four candidates to be elected.

Conseil Scolaire Public de District du Centre-Sud Ouest
One candidate to be elected, representing Waterloo Region, Middlesex County, Wellington County, Perth County and Huron County.

Conseil Scolaire de District Catholiques Centre-Sud
1 Candidate to be elected, representing the Region of Waterloo, and the Counties of Wellington, Brant, Haldimand and Norfolk

Ward Referendum

Timeline
 September 29, 2006 - Nominations close.
 November 13, 2006 - Election Day.

Issues

Professionalism on City Council

Wet/Dry Recycling

Heritage Protection

Growth Management

See also
2006 Ontario municipal elections

References

External links

Neutral links
 Guelph Civic League
 The Fountain Pen

2006 Ontario municipal elections
2006